Selago fruticosa is a species of plant in the family Scrophulariaceae. It is endemic to South Africa.

References

Endemic flora of South Africa
Renosterveld
fruticosa
Least concern plants